Onofre Abellanosa june 12 1913 (1913 – 1974) was a Filipino Visayan writer of short stories and plays.

Known works 
 Ang Kagabhion (short story), published in Bisaya, 1946.
 Floriki (play), 1930.
 Gahom sa Latigo (play), 1965.

References 
 Visayan Literature page—defunct

Biography:
Pen name - Diwa Salak
Date of Birth - June 12, 1913
Date of Death - June 11, 1974
Cause of Death: Cancer of the Liver
Course: Bachelor of Arts, Bachelor in Secondary Education
Early Life: He start to write when he was young. He loves to read history, literature and geography. He was a war volunteer USAFE. He worked at the office administration.
      Parents:
Father - 
           Baldomero Abellanosa - musician, composer, band leader 
Mother - 
           Cirila Abasolo Abellanosa
Siblings - 
           1.Victorino (writer, composer, playwright) 
           2.Ramon (writer, politician)
           3.Bienvinida 
           4.Jose (musician)
           5.Onofre (teacher, playwright)
           6. Generoso (musician)
           7. German (died during world war 2)
           8.Josefa (teacher)  
           9.Miguel (teacher, musician)

Wife - 
           Maria Villena Pacres (Cheong Hsiong)
Children -
          1. Themistocles - Bachelor of Laws, Bachelor in Secondary Education (University of the Visayas)
          2. Mansueto - Bachelor in Secondary Education (University of the Visayas)
          3. Andres - AB, Bachelor of Laws, Bachelor in Secondary Education (University of the Visayas)
          4. Franklin - AB, Bachelor of Laws, Bachelor in Secondary Education (University of the Visayas)
          5. Paz - Bachelor in Secondary Education (University of the Visayas)
          6. Editha - BSEED (University of the Visayas)
          7. Onofre Jr. - Bachelor of Science in Criminology (University of the Visayas)
          8. Lillian - AB (University of the Visayas), BS Nursing (Southwestern University)
          9. Edgar - Bachelor of Science in Engineering (University of the Visayas)
          10.Desiree - BS Nursing (Cebu City Hospital)
          11.Rico - Bachelor of Laws (University of San Carlos)
        
         *Onofre Abasolo-Abellanosa Sr. - Magbabalak ug Magsusulat
                       Anaa na ikaw diin ang tanan ingon sa damgo. 
                       Anaa ka na sa gingharian sa pahulayang dayon, 
                       Apan sa kasingkasing namo kami maghandum kanimo. 
                       Ang imong ngalan usa ka awit nga walay kamatayon.
                                                         -Diwa Salak

             Sources: Lillian Abellanosa - Arao-arao, Desiree Abellanosa-Lucenio, Edgar Pacre-Abellanosa

Visayan writers
Cebuano writers
1913 births
1974 deaths
Filipino writers
Cebuano people